Delbert E. Metzger (March 4, 1875 - April 24, 1967) was a United States district judge of the United States District Court for the District of Hawaii in the Territory of Hawaii.

Early life and education 

Born in Ozwakie, Jefferson County, Kansas. Delbert  grew up on the shores of Lake Perry, outside of Topeka, he attended local private and public schools before attending Washburn College in Topeka for a year in 1893–94.

Career 

Delbert E. Metzger worked as a realtor, a grain dealer, a newspaper publisher, a theatrical producer, an accountant, a justice of peace, city attorney, and mining engineer.

He volunteered for service as an engineer in the U.S. Army in the Spanish American War. In 1899, he was sent to Oahu to complete the first land survey of Pearl Harbor. Metzger remained in Hawaii, drilling artesian wells for Lucius E. Pinkham.

He was a railroad superintendent for the Oahu Railroad, and later served as a Territorial Senator, District Magistrate, and Territorial Treasurer.

On July 12, 1934, Metzger was nominated to be a judge on the former 4th Circuit territorial court in Hilo.

Federal judicial service 

In 1939, Metzger was nominated by President Franklin D. Roosevelt to a seat on the United States District Court for the District of Hawaii vacated by Judge Edward Minor Watson Jr. He was confirmed by the United States Senate on the same day on August 2, 1939. He was sworn in on August 25, 1939.

References

1875 births
1967 deaths
American judges